Yolanda... Live In Washington is an album by gospel singer Yolanda Adams. This album contains performances previously only available on live VHS concerts, as well as two studio tracks: "Praise Your Holy Name," and "Thank You." The latter was re-recorded on Adams' 2001 album Believe.

Track listing 
 "The Only Way" (Fred Vaughn, Mervyn Warren) - 7:06
 "Let Us Worship Him" (Armirris Palmore) -  7:05
 "My Everything" (Yolanda Adams, Ben Tankard) - 5:38
 "Just A Prayer Away" (Gregory Curtis) - 7:37
 "The Battle Is the Lord's" (V. Michael McKay) - 6:29 
 "I'll Always Remember" (Armirris Palmore) - 9:09
 "This Joy" (Pharis "June Bug" Evans Jr.) - 6:06
 "Through The Storm" (V. Michael McKay) - 5:26
 "Save The World" (Raymond Reeder) - 6:38
 "Praise Your Holy Name" (Derek Clark) - 4:35
 "Thank You" (John Croslan II) - 6:15

Personnel
 Yolanda Adams – vocals, producer 
 Raymond Angry – keyboards 
 Angela Bell – additional vocals 
 Rodney Covington – additional vocals
 Rémy David – engineer 
 Larry Day – producer 
 Tyrone Dickerson – keyboards, producer, music director, choir director
 Juanita Edwards – additional vocals
 Anthony Harmon – bass 
 Yomme Johnson – additional vocals
 Ann McCrary – additional vocals
 Gayle Mayes – additional vocals
 Armirris Palmore – additional vocals
 Angela Primm – additional vocals
 Desmond Pringle – additional vocals
 Phillip Ratliff – guitar
 Raymond Reeder – choir director 
 Oscar Seaton – drums
 Sylvia Logan-Sharp – additional vocals
 Kevin Szymanski – assistant engineer 
 Ben Tankard – producer, mixing
 Union Temple Youth – choir vocals 
 Union Temple Concert – choir vocals 
 Vanessa Williams – additional vocals
 Suzanne Young – additional vocals

Chart positions

References

External links
 

Yolanda Adams albums
1996 live albums